The Prince of Graustark is a 1916 American silent romantic drama film directed by Fred E. Wright and starring Bryant Washburn, Marguerite Clayton and Sidney Ainsworth. Produced by the Chicago-based Essanay Pictures, it is based on the 1914 novel of the same title by George Barr McCutcheon. Future star Colleen Moore made her screen debut in an uncredited role as a maid.

Cast
 Bryant Washburn as Prince Robin of Graustark
 Marguerite Clayton as Princess of Dawsbergen
 Sidney Ainsworth as Count Quinnox
 Ernest Maupain as William H. Blithers
 Florence Oberle as Mrs. Blithers
 John Cossar as Baron Douglas	
 William V. Mong as Aide to Count Quinnox 
 Colleen Moore as Maid

References

Bibliography
 Abel, Richard. Menus for Movieland: Newspapers and the Emergence of American Film Culture, 1913–1916. University of California Press, 2015.

External links
 

1916 films
1916 drama films
1910s English-language films
American silent feature films
Silent American drama films
American black-and-white films
Films directed by Fred E. Wright
Essanay Studios films
1910s American films